The  Big Horned Sheepeater Indian War of 1879 was the last Indian war fought in the Pacific Northwest portion of the United States; it took place primarily in central Idaho. A high mountain band of approximately 300 Shoshone people, the Tukudeka, were known as the "Big Horned" Game Hunters because they ate Big Horn Game like Rocky Mountain sheep akin to other bands of Shoshone who were known by those sacred foods they lived amongst and ate by hunting, fishing, and gathering them, such as: the Agaideka; Salmoneaters, Tukadeka; Bighorn Game Eaters (Sheepeaters was the name given by settlers, as TukuDeka is translated as Big-Horned Game by Shoshone TukuDeka). The word "eater" used amongst the different bands across Shoshone homelands can be also translated into nourishment.. Tukadeka bands were proficient at hunting. Their Big Horned Sheep Bow and other Big Horned Bows were sought after by both settlers and other tribes.  They were the last Tribe living Traditionally on the American Rocky Mountains  they were known as 'Sheepeaters' as Bighorn Sheep were a main staple of food, clothing, and tools. The TukuDeka have become part of the Salmon Eater Shoshones after the war. They were being pushed from their homelands for settlers. The TukuDeka did not call this a war as it started with the brutal killing and attack of a small family in the Yellowstone area. Their Primary home was the Yellowstone Park.

Background
Leading up to the war, European-American settlers accused the Shoshone of stealing horses (which they were known for being the horse people of these west) in Indian Valley and killing three settlers near present-day Cascade, Idaho during the pursuit. In August, the Shoshone were accused of killing two prospectors in an ambush at Pearsall Creek, five miles from Cascade. By February 1879 they were accused of the murders of five Chinese miners at Oro Grande, murders at Loon Creek, and finally the murders of two ranchers in the South Fork of the Salmon River in May. There was no evidence for these accusations.

Campaign
United States troops were ordered into action based on the settler's complaints. Heading the campaign against the Sheepeaters was Troop G of the 1st Cavalry led by Captain Reuben Bernard, Company C and a detachment of Company K from the 2nd Infantry Regiment  under the command of First Lieutenant Henry Catley, and 20 Indian scouts commanded by Lieutenant Edward Farrow of the 21st Infantry. The troops were all heading toward Payette Lake, near present-day McCall.  Bernard headed North from Boise barracks, Catley headed South from Camp Howard, and Farrow headed East from the Umatilla Agency.

Throughout the campaign, the troops faced difficulty traveling through the rough terrain. The first segment of the campaign, from May 31 to September 8, was through the Salmon River, dubbed the "River of No Return" because it was barely navigable. By August 20, a Sheepeater raiding party of ten to fifteen Indians attacked the troops as they guarded a pack train at Soldier Bar on Big Creek. Those who defended the pack train included Corporal Charles B. Hardin along with six troopers and the chief packer, James Barnes. They managed to drive the Sheepeaters off with only one casualty, Private Harry Eagan of the 2nd Infantry. By October, the campaign ended once Lieutenants W.C. Brown and Edward S. Farrow, along with a group of twenty Umatilla scouts, negotiated the surrender of the Sheepeaters.

See also
List of U.S. military history events
Idaho
Indian Wars

Notes

References

Parker, Aaron. The Sheepeater Indian Campaign (Chamberlin Basin Country). Idaho Country Free Press, c1968.

External links
Something About Everything Military: Indian Wars
Winning the West the Army in the Indian Wars, 1865-1890

Shoshone
Conflicts in 1879
Wars involving the indigenous peoples of North America
Pre-statehood history of Idaho
Native American history of Idaho
Indian wars of the American Old West
Wars between the United States and Native Americans